Gonzalo Ruiz De La Cruz (born ) is a Mexican male volleyball player. He is part of the Mexico men's national volleyball team. On club level he plays for IMSS ATN.

References

External links
 profile at FIVB.org

1988 births
Living people
Mexican men's volleyball players
Place of birth missing (living people)
Olympic volleyball players of Mexico
Volleyball players at the 2016 Summer Olympics